Flesh for Lulu were an English rock band formed in Brixton, London, England, active between 1982 and 1992. They reformed from 2013 to 2015 with a new lineup. Initially part of the post-punk scene, the band's sound shifted to reflect influences from pop music, country and western, rhythm and blues and blues.

History
Nick Marsh (vocals and guitar) and James Mitchell (drums) formed the band and soon recruited Rocco Barker (originally from Wasted Youth, guitar and vocals), and Glen Bishop (bass), taking their name from an American cult movie. After a well received John Peel session, they signed to Polydor Records in 1983, and soon thereafter, bassist Glen Bishop left to join Under Two Flags, and was replaced by Kevin Mills (formerly of Specimen).

Their first EP, "Roman Candle" did well, but the label dropped them a year later after their eponymous first album failed to find any commercial success.

In 1985, the band signed to Hybrid Records and released the mini LP Blue Sisters Swing, which was produced with Craig Leon. The cover image of two nuns kissing resulted in the album being banned in the United States and Europe. Flesh for Lulu then joined Statik Records, which released Big Fun City later that year.

The following year, the band signed to Beggars Banquet Records, and their song "I Go Crazy" was featured in Some Kind of Wonderful and received some airplay on American college rock radio stations. This allowed Flesh for Lulu to sustain a successful tour of the US.

In 1989, "Decline and Fall" followed and became a top 15 hit on the new Modern Rock Tracks chart. The next year, "Time and Space" written by newest member Del Strangefish (ex-Peter and the Test Tube Babies guitarist) became their biggest U.S. hit, reaching the top 10 of the Modern Rock chart, but the song failed to chart on any other U.S. chart. After Capitol Records dropped the band, a record deal with Hollywood Records fell through. The band disbanded soon after with singer Nick Marsh stating, "The reason Flesh really split up is because there wasn't a definite...to coin the oldest cliché of them all, there were musical differences. That's true, there were two separate trains of thought."

The song "Postcards from Paradise" was covered by Paul Westerberg as a secret bonus track on his 2002 album Stereo. The Goo Goo Dolls also covered the same song, which is part of a "deluxe edition" release of their 2010 album Something for the Rest of Us available on the band's website.

Gigantic
In 1996, Nick Marsh and Rocco Barker formed a band they named Gigantic, recruiting Dave Blair on bass and Al Fletcher on drums. Columbia Records signed them, and put them on tour with the Goo Goo Dolls and Bush. Their first album was a commercial flop, and the group disbanded in 1998.

After the breakup of Gigantic, Nick Marsh released a solo album and performed with the bourbon-soaked gypsy bop and stroll band Urban Voodoo Machine. Rocco Barker joined a band named The Space Police with reggae/jungle artist General Levy and Italian keyboardist and producer Dr. Cat (aka Luca Gatti).

In 2007, Gigantic's only album Disenchanted, originally released in 1996 on Columbia Records, was repackaged and reissued on Corporate Risk as Gigantic under the Flesh for Lulu name. A single titled "Phenomenal" was released in 1997, but the track did not appear on the 1996 album.

Rocco was featured on the Channel 4 series A Place in Spain: Costa Chaos (2008).

Reformation and death of Nick Marsh
In 2013, Nick Marsh reformed Flesh for Lulu with a new line-up consisting of Marsh (vocals/guitar), Mark Bishop (drums), Keith McAndrew (bass) and Will Crewdson (guitar).

Marsh died on 5 June 2015 from cancer, aged 53.

Discography

Studio albums
Flesh for Lulu (1984, Polydor)
Big Fun City (1985, Statik)
Long Live the New Flesh (1987, Beggars Banquet UK, Capitol US)
Plastic Fantastic (1989, Beggars Banquet UK, Capitol US)
Gigantic (2007) (Gigantic's 1996 Disenchanted album reissued under Flesh for Lulu name)
The Best of Flesh for Lulu [Re-Recorded] (2009, Corporate-Risk Products)

Extended plays
Roman Candle (1983, Polydor)
Blue Sisters Swing (1985, Hybrid)
Idol (1986, Beggars Banquet)

Live album
Fresh Flesh (1986, Dojo)

Singles
"Roman Candle" (1983, Polydor)
"Subterraneans" (1984, Polydor)
"Restless" (1984, Polydor)
"Baby Hurricane" (1985, Statik)
"Idol" (1986, Beggars Banquet)
"I Go Crazy" (1987, Beggars Banquet)
"Siamese Twist" (1987, Beggars Banquet)
"Postcards from Paradise" (1987, Beggars Banquet)
"Decline and Fall" (1989, Beggars Banquet) #15 Billboard Modern Rock
"Time and Space" (1990, Beggars Banquet) #9 Billboard Modern Rock
"Every Little Word" (1990 Promo, Capitol)
"She Was" (1991 Promo, MCA)
"Cold Flame/Big Love" (2007, Corporate-Risk Products)

Compilation appearances
 Nintendo: White Knuckle Scorin' (1991) "She Was"

Soundtrack appearances
 Some Kind of Wonderful (1987) "I Go Crazy"
  Uncle Buck (1989) "Slide", "Slowdown" (only used in film)
 Flashback (1990) "Next Time (I'll Dream of You)"
 The Next Karate Kid (1994) "Mystic Trader" (only used in film)

References

External links
Official band website
FFL fan site
Nick Marsh's site

English gothic rock groups
Musical groups established in 1982
Musical groups disestablished in 1992
English pop rock music groups
English post-punk music groups
Musical groups reestablished in 2013
Musical groups disestablished in 2015
1982 establishments in England
Beggars Banquet Records artists
Musical groups from London